Innan filmen tagit slut is the 17th studio album by Swedish musician Magnus Uggla, released on 2 November 2011. It is the most recently released studio album by Uggla.

Track listing
Lyrics by Magnus Uggla and music by Anders Henriksson and Magnus Uggla, except where noted otherwise.
 "Är det så här det ska vara nu" (Magnus Uggla)
 "Innan filmen tagit slut"
 "Gör mig till din man"
 "Leva livet"
 "Tänker på dig"
 "Precis en sån är jag" (Magnus Uggla)
 "Prata prata"
 "Bara jag får komma hemifrån"
 "Jag vill ha dig baby"
 "15 supar"

The songs, "Tänker på dig" and "Jag vill ha dig baby", feature vocals by Edith Backlund.

Charts

Weekly charts

Year-end charts

References 

2011 albums
Magnus Uggla albums
Swedish-language albums